Kirill Shevchenko (born 22 September 2002) is a Ukrainian (until 2022) and Romanian (since 2023) chess grandmaster.

Chess career 
Born in 2002, Shevchenko earned his international master title in 2016 and his grandmaster title in 2017, at the age of 14 years 10 months. In February 2018, he competed in the Aeroflot Open and finished 51 out of 92, scoring 4½/9 (+2–2=5). In March 2018, he competed in the European Individual Chess Championship and placed 32nd, scoring 7½/11 (+6–2=3).

In November 2021, Shevchenko won the Lindores Abbey Blitz tournament in Riga, Latvia. He finished clear first on 14/18, half a point ahead of Fabiano Caruana and Arjun Erigaisi. Later in the month, he represented Ukraine at the European Team Chess Championship. He played on board 4, scoring 4½/8 (+1–0=7), as Ukraine won gold.

References

External links
 
 
 

2002 births
Living people
Chess grandmasters
Sportspeople from Kyiv
Ukrainian chess players
Romanian chess players
Ukrainian emigrants to Romania
Naturalised citizens of Romania